The 1999–2000 Idaho Vandals men's basketball team represented the University of Idaho during the 1999–2000 NCAA Division I men's basketball season. Members of the Big West Conference, the Vandals were led by third-year head coach David Farrar and played their home games on campus at the Kibbie Dome in Moscow, Idaho.

They met West division champion Long Beach State in the first round of the conference tournament and lost by

Postseason result

|-
!colspan=6 style=| Big West tournament

References

External links
Sports Reference – Idaho Vandals: 1999–2000 basketball season
Gem of the Mountains: 2000 University of Idaho yearbook – 1999–2000 basketball season
Idaho Argonaut – student newspaper – 2000 editions

Idaho Vandals men's basketball seasons
Idaho
2000 in sports in Idaho
Idaho